The Most Beautiful Woman in Town & Other Stories is a collection of anecdotal short stories by American author Charles Bukowski. The stories are written in both the first and third-person, in Bukowski's trademark semi-autobiographical short prose style. In keeping with his other works, themes include: Los Angeles bar culture; alcoholism; gambling; sex and violence. However, many of the stories contain elements of fantasy and surrealism. The book was initially printed as Erections, Ejaculations, Exhibitions, and General Tales of Ordinary Madness . The stories originally appeared in Open City, Nola Express, Knight, Adam, Adam Reader, Pix, The Berkeley Barb and Evergreen Review.

Contents
Kid Stardust on the Porterhouse
Life in a Texas Whorehouse
Six Inches
The Fuck Machine
The Gut-Wringing Machine
3 Women
3 Chickens
Ten Jack-Offs
Twelve Flying Monkeys Who Won't Copulate Properly
25 Bums in Rags
Non-Horseshit Horse Advice
Another Horse Story
The Birth, Life and Death of an Underground Newspaper
Life and Death in the Charity Ward
The Day We Talked About James Thurber
All the Great Writers
The Copulating Mermaid of Venice, Calif
Trouble with a Battery
(swastika symbol)
Politics is like Trying to Screw a Cat in the Ass
My Big-Assed Mother
A Lovely Love Affair
All the Pussy We Want
The Beginner
The Fiend
The Murder of Ramon Vasquez
A Drinking Partner
The White Beard
A White Pussy

Trivia

 In the film The Rules of Attraction the book can be seen in the drawer of Sean Bateman's room.

1983 short story collections
Short story collections by Charles Bukowski
City Lights Publishers books